Ewohimi is a town in Esan South East Local Government of Edo State, Nigeria. Ewohimi lies on the geographical coordinate of latitude .

History 
The name of the town is Ebhoikimi (meaning "a place/town of Ikimi") from the original name is Orikimi. The town was founded by a man named Ikimi, an immigrant from the Benin Kingdom.

References 

Populated places in Edo State